The climate of Myanmar varies depending on location and in the highlands, on elevation. The climate is subtropical/tropical and has three seasons, a "cool winter from November to February, a hot summer season in March and April and a rainy season from May to October, dominated by the southwest monsoon." The higher elevations of the highlands are predisposed to heavy snowfall, especially in the North.

The climate of Myanmar has a significant impact on tourist arrivals. Tourists tend to avoid the rainy season and travel in the dry season which runs between November and April with peak inflows occurring between December and February.

Geography 

Myanmar has three agro-ecological zones and eight physiographic regions.

Agro-ecological zones 

 Coastal zone
 Central dry zone
 Hilly zone

Physiographic regions 

 Rakhine Coastal
 Ayeyarwadv Delta
 Yangon Deltaic 
 Southern Myanmar Coastal
 Central Dry Zone
 Western Hilly 
 Northern Hilly 
 Eastern Hilly

Examples

Disasters

Droughts 
Rising temperatures and increased drought in Myanmar have caused diminished village water sources across the country, destroyed agricultural yields of peas, sugar cane, tomatoes and rice, and are expected to continue having negative effects on agricultural production and food security by further destruction of cultivation and erosion on soils in the long term. There is a large dependence on rain fed agriculture, as over 70% percent of it people's livelihood dependent on natural capital, and 40% of GDP reliant on agriculture, livestock, fisheries, and forestry. In the dry zone, longer more extreme droughts and losses of natural ecosystem services which play a role in retaining sediment force those in more rural areas to travel miles for water where lakes have not dried posing considerable livelihood challenges.

Monsoons 
In August 2015, extreme flooding caused by monsoon rains killed 27 people and affected over 150,000 in the Sagaing region and in July 2018 over 120,000 people over seven regions were displaced from their homes also due to heavy monsoon rains, with the death toll hitting at least 10.

Climate change 

Some researchers and organizations have predicted that climate impacts could pose a hazard. To combat any potential hardships, the government of Myanmar has displayed interest in expanding its use of renewable energy and lowering its level of carbon emissions. Groups involved in helping Myanmar with the transition and move forward include the UN Environment Programme, Myanmar Climate Change Alliance (MCCA), and the Ministry of Natural Resources and Environmental Conservation.  In April 2015, it was announced that the World Bank and Myanmar would enter a full partnership framework aimed to better access to electricity and other basic services for about six million people and expected to benefit three million pregnant woman and children through improved health services. Myanmar has also acquired funding and proper planning, which is intended to better prepare the country for the impacts of climate change by enacting programs which teach its people new farming methods, rebuild its infrastructure with materials resilient to natural disasters, and transition various sectors towards reducing greenhouse gas emissions.

To this end the country has also entered the United Nation's Paris Agreement in 2016, created the Myanmar National Climate Change Policy in 2017,  submitted its new climate action plan to the UN Framework Convention on Climate Change, and developed the Myanmar Climate Change Strategy & Action Plan. At the same time, Myanmar's state technical capacity to conduct international climate change negotiations and implement environmental agreements remains limited and the country requires external assistance in improving its technical capacities.

Dry zone adjustments 
The government of Myanmar, the United Nations Development Programme, and the Adaptation Fund, are carrying out programs to provide farmers the resources, knowledge and tools needed to support good harvests, despite changing weather patterns.  Anticipated to reduce food insecurity and losses from extreme climate events in 42,000 households, the "Addressing Climate Change Risks on Water Resources and Food Security in the Dry Zone of Myanmar" project provides specially developed climate resistant pulses and other crops, as well as special heat resistant breeds of pigs, goats, and poultry to farmers and laborers. In the past, poverty stricken communities cut down trees for fuels and timber, so now communities are being actively involved in establishing and managing forests in order to improve soil conditions, reduce surface runoff, and slow erosion. Nearly 30,000 households in the region have benefited from enhanced water capture and storage capacity in the forms of expanded community ponds, construction on diversion canals, and rehabilitation and protection of over 4,000 hectares of micro-watersheds. To help Myanmar meet its 2030 Water Sanitation and Hygiene Goals, Lien Aid also continues to partner with local governments and community leaders to improve safe water access in villages throughout Myanmar.

References 

Myanmar
Environment of Myanmar
Geography of Myanmar